Caenia is a genus of net-winged beetles in the family Lycidae. There are at least 3 described species in Caenia.

Species
 Caenia amplicornis LeConte, 1881
 Caenia dimidiata (Fabricius, 1801)
 Caenia sp-nova

References

 Miller, Richard S. / Arnett, Ross H. Jr., Michael C. Thomas, Paul E. Skelley, and J. H. Frank, eds. (2002). "Family 59. Lycidae Laporte 1836". American Beetles, vol. 2: Polyphaga: Scarabaeoidea through Curculionoidea, 174–178.

Further reading

 Arnett, R.H. Jr., M. C. Thomas, P. E. Skelley and J. H. Frank. (eds.). (2002). American Beetles, Volume II: Polyphaga: Scarabaeoidea through Curculionoidea. CRC Press LLC, Boca Raton, FL.
 
 Richard E. White. (1983). Peterson Field Guides: Beetles. Houghton Mifflin Company.

External links

 NCBI Taxonomy Browser, Caenia

Lycidae